The 157th New York Infantry Regiment was a regiment of infantry organized in New York state during the American Civil War.

On August 13, 1862, Colonel Philip P. Brown Jr. was authorized to recruit this regiment in the then 23d Senatorial District of the State. It was organized at Hamilton, convening in the service of the United States for three years from September 19, 1862. On June 22, 1865, the men not to be Muster (military) with the regiment were transferred to the 54th New York Volunteer Infantry.

Organization

The companies were recruited principally: 
A at Hamilton, Madison, Sherburne and Georgetown; 
B at Oneida; 
C at Hamilton, Cincinnatus, Marathon, Cuyler, Taylor, Willet, Solon, Freetown and Pitcher; 
D at Scott, Preble and Homer; 
E at Cortland, Virgil, Harford and Cortlandville; 
F at Smyrna, Smithfield, Lebanon, Georgetown, Hamilton, Eaton and Madison; 
G at Canastota, Lennox, Clockville, Wampsville, Oneida and Hamilton; 
H at Homer, Truxton and Cortlandville; 
I at Sullivan, Smithfield and Hamilton;
K at Cortlandville, Marathon, Harford, Freetown and Virgil.

Service Dates
The regiment left the State September 25, 1862.

Service dates are as follows:
From October, 1862 - 1st Brigade, 3d Division, 11th Corps
From July 13, 1863 - 2nd Brigade, 1st Division, 11th Corps
From August, 1863 -  2nd Brigade, Gordon's Division, 10th Corps, on Folly and Morris Islands, South Carolina, 
From January, 1864 - in Schimmelfenning's Division, 10th Corps
From February, 1864 - 1st Brigade, Ames' Division, 10th Corps, then in the District of Florida
From June 15, 1864 - at Beaufort, South Carolina
From September 5, 1864 - on Morris Island, South Carolina
From October 22 to November 28, 1864 - at Fort Pulaski, Georgia
From November 1864 - 1st, Potter's, Brigade, Coast Division, Department of the Gulf
From February 1865 - at Georgetown, South Carolina 
July 10, 1865 - Commanded by Col. James C. Carmichael, it was honorably discharged and mustered out at Charleston, South Carolina.

Legacy
During the American Civil War the 157th participated in the Mud March, the Battle of Chancellorsville, and the Battle of Gettysburg.  On the first day at Gettysburg they suffered in heavy fighting north of the town.  On the second day they were a reserve regiment rushed to the aid of the 137th New York holding the right flank on Culp's Hill.

They guarded the "Immortal 600" Confederate officers at Fort Pulaski, Georgia.  This was a special group of prisoners that were there for the "purpose of retaliation".  Col. Brown and his men, though, treated the prisoners better than their orders specified and this led to an official reprimand for Col. Brown, much to the Confederates' dismay.

Roster

Casualties

Killed in action, 5 officers, 50 enlisted men; 
Died of wounds received in action, 2 Officers, 40 enlisted men;
Died of disease and other causes, 2 officers, 104 enlisted men; 
Total, 9 officers, 194 enlisted men; 
Aggregate, 203; of whom 1 officer, 4 enlisted men, died in the hands of the enemy

See also
List of New York Civil War regiments

References

External links
 

Military units and formations in New York (state)
Infantry 157
1862 establishments in New York (state)
Military units and formations established in 1862
Military units and formations disestablished in 1865